Start screen may refer to:
 Home screen
 Boot screen, a screen shown at the start of an operating system
 Loading screen, a screen shown at the start of a level or mission in a video game
 Splash screen, a screen shown at the start of a computer program
 Start screen (Windows), in Windows 8.x and Windows Server 2012
 Title screen, a screen shown at the start of video game